Oedogonium is a genus of filamentous, free-living green algae. It was first discovered in the fresh waters of Poland 1860 by W. Hilse and later named by German scientist K. E. Hirn. The morphology of Oedogonium is unique, with an interior and exterior that function very differently from one another and change throughout its life cycle. These protists reside in freshwater ecosystems in both hemispheres and are both benthic and planktonic in nature. Forming algal patches on water's surface, they interact closely with a multitude of other algae. These filamentous cell's life cycles include both sexual and asexual reproduction, depending on life cycle stage. Although quite common, Oedogonium is difficult to identify, since key ID factors are only present during reproduction, which is an uncommon life stage among this genus. Oedogonium has been found to be important in the fixation of heavy metals in freshwater ecosystems.

Etymology
Although K.E. Hirn was the first to publish concerning Odeogoniales, it is not clear as to whether he was the first to discover this new genus. First named Oedogoniaceen (German), Hirn used his knowledge of the Latin language to describe and name the green algal genus; oedos meaning swelling/tumor, and gonos meaning offspring/seed. This name was meant to describe the morphology during sexual and asexual reproduction which he saw and described within his publication, “Monographie und iconographie der Oedogoniaceen”.

History of Knowledge
Oedogonium species were first reported in the late 19th century by Hilse (1860), Gołowin (1964), Kirchner (1878), Kozłowski (1895) and Gutwiński (1897). Hilse was a Polish phycologist who studied freshwater systems in hopes of learning more about microorganisms and how they interacted with their environment. Along with Oedogonium, Hilse is also credited with the discovery and classification of many diatoms. Mrozińska was the first to exam this group in terms of morphology, ecology and distribution and in his time described more than 400 species – mainly from southern Poland. 

In 1900, German scientist K.E. Hirn wrote a monograph concerning his finding of a new taxon, to which he promptly gave the name Oedogoniaceen – now Oedogonium. This paper was published and translated 60 years later. Hirn discovered Oedogonium in a ditch, appearing from June – October, but not much else is known as this was his only published contribution and he died in 1907 (7 years following his discovery). Since this 1900 monograph, this taxon has been vital in ongoing studies regarding biosorption of heavy metals – particularly lead – from fresh water ecosystems. Identification of species within Oedogonium is extremely difficult since I.D. factors are mainly based on reproductive characters, and very rarely are species in this genus discovered in their reproductive state. For the most part they exist in a filamentous form.

In 1991 a paper by Mrozińska presented a new taxonomic classification of the genus Oedogonium and a proposed division into two sections: I. Monospermatozoideae and II. Dispermatozoideae. These sections were based on the different number of spermatozoids the antheridial (male sex organ containing) cell expresses. This classification is not widely accepted, as it still requires support through further studies.

Morphology

Exterior
Cells of the genus Oedogonium are narrow and cylindrical in shape. The algal body consists of green, un-branched, and multi-cellular filaments, arranged end to end. Every cell of the filamentous algal body (called the thallus) is similar in shape apart from the apical cell (the uppermost) and the holdfast cell (the lowermost). The apical cell is wider and always rounded at its tip (having a cap) relative to the other cells of the thallus. The holdfast cell, however, produces elongated growths from both unattached sides which aid in firmly attaching the filament to substrate. The holdfast is also the only colourless cell of the filament. All other cells in the filament exist as green structures very similar in nature, with only some cells having caps. The number of caps per cell illustrates the number of times that cell has divided. Every cell of the filament has a cell wall consisting of three layers – the innermost is made of cellulose, the middle of pectose, and the outermost is made of chitin. These three layers provide rigidity and protection for these benthic species. Most cells are attached to the substrate by the holdfast and are vegetative cells, although some are free-floating.Species of Oedogonium are divided into two major groups based on distribution of the sex organs: macrandous and nannandrous species. Macrandous species have a male sex organ (the antheridia) and female sex organ (the oogonia) produced on filaments of normal size. This group is further subdivided into macrandous monoecious and macrandous dioecious. In macrandous monoecious species, the antheridia and oogonia are always found on the same filament. In contrary, in macrandous dioecious species, the antheridia and oogonia are produced on different filaments. Although filaments bearing antheridia and oogonia are morphologically similar, they differ physiologically. In nannandrous species, filaments producing antheridia and oogonia show morphological distinction. The antheridia, which are much smaller than the oogonia, are called dwarf male. Nannandrous species are always dioecious; i.e. antheridia and oogonia are always produced on different filaments. Small male filaments are likely to be attached to a female filament, near an oogonium.

Interior
The protoplasm of Oedogonium is contained by a plasma membrane, and consists of a single nucleus, reticulate chloroplasts, cytoplasm and a central vacuole. Cell sap (contained by the central vacuole) is made up of inorganic compounds, excretions and secretions. Between the innermost cell wall and the central vacuole is a thin layer known as the protoplast. The single nucleus is large and oval shaped and sits in the centre of the cell – usually along the membrane and internal to the chloroplast. This large nucleus contains 1-2 nucleoli and elongated chromosomes. The reticulate, parietal chloroplast extends over the whole interior of the cell, enveloping the protoplast. Whether these networked strands are narrow or broad varies between species, but with most species these reticula are parallel to the long axis of the cell. At the strand junctions are pyrenoids, covered in starch plates.

Cells of Oedogonium also contain very typical Golgi bodies, mitochondria, and endoplasmic reticulum.

Habitat and Ecology
Oedogonium resides in freshwater ecosystems and prefers stagnant waters, such as small ponds, pools, roadside ditches, marshes, lakes, and reservoirs. It grows over a large pH range (7.3-9.6) and presents a wide tolerance to variation in nutrient type and amount in water. Cells exist either fastened to substrate at the bottom of the water system or free-floating within. When free-floating they form polyalgal patches (mats) on the water's surface to establish a relatively static habitat. Mats are created by interweaving multiple different algal filaments that are suspended in a gelatinous matrix. This matrix is a result of secretions by free floating thalli. Benthic cells are most often juvenile filaments and once matured they tend to let go, float to the top and form the mats. Oedogonium filaments typically appear during the warmer months, appearing at the end of June (north of the equator), and throughout July and August are found prevalent in polyalgal mats. Mats formed by Oedogonium are multi-species, associated with Spirogyra, Rhizoclonium, and Cladophora. Together these species use holdfast cells to grip one another in order to photosynthesize. These mats/patches are also known as algal blooms.

Life Cycles

Asexual Reproduction
Oedogonium can reproduce asexually by fragmentation of the filaments, germination of aplanospores and akinetes, and through zoospores. In fragmentation, the filament splits apart and each fragment reproduces to form a fully functioning thallus. Splitting can occur more than once at the same position of the filament, explaining why some cells have more than one cap. The splitting of fragmentation may or may not be intentional – it could occur due to natural damage by the environment or predators. 

Asexual reproduction via zoospore is also very common and occurs in vegetative (benthic) cells. Vegetative cells produce zoosporangia – the enclosure in which spores are formed – which give rise to the zoospores. Each zoospore has a small hyaline anterior region, and at the base of this region is a ring of flagella (~150). Once emerged from the zoosporangium, a zoospore is still enveloped by a fragile vesicle, from which it is soon discharged.  Following dispersal, the zoospore experiences a short period of motility in which it searches for a substrate. When attached to a substrate, the ring of flagella is lost, and the zoospore begins dividing to form a new filament. 

Germination of aplanospores and akinetes is uncommon but possible. An aplanospore is non- motile and formed within a vegetative cell, the wall of which is distinct from that of the parent cell. Under certain unfavourable conditions, aplanospores will secrete thick walls around them and store abundant food reserves. An akinete spore is large, non-motile, and thick walled, the wall of which is fused to that of the parent cell. Akinetes thick cell walls are enriched in food materials. Both aplanospores and akinetes are able to withstand unfavourable habitual conditions (cold, winter months or nutrient poor waters) and within these conditions remain dormant. With the onset of favourable conditions (such as warm winter months), they can germinate to form a new individual. 

As these processes are all forms of asexual reproduction, they do not produce genetic diversity in the offspring. Therefore, asexual reproduced Oedogonium are more vulnerable to changing environments.

Sexual Reproduction
Sexual reproduction in Oedogonium is oogamous; and can be monoecious or dioecious. Species may either be macrandrous (lacking dwarf males) or nannandrous (possessing dwarf males). Dwarf males are small, short, antheridium-producing filaments attached near the oogonia (female sex organ). These dwarf males are derived by repeated cell division of multiflagellate androspores. When an oogonial mother cell divides it forms a swollen oogonium bound by a supporting cell. Oogonial cells may exist in a series along the filament, and so division may also occur in a series; resulting in each oogonium containing a single egg. Production of an egg causes swelling of the cell wall, responsible for the name given by Hirn in 1900 – oedos (swelling) and gonos (seed/offspring). Antheridia are short and disk-shaped, containing 1 to 2 multi-flagellated sperm cells. Motile male gametes will exit the antheridia and are chemotactically attracted to oogonia. A single sperm cell will pass through a pore opening in the oogonial cell wall, allowing fertilization. Zygotes (oospores) are initially green but will gradually become an orange-red colour and develop a thick multilayered cell wall with species specific surface adornments. Meiosis occurs in the zygote prior to germination, producing four multi-flagellated cells after germination. Once freed from the oogonium, each daughter cell is only motile for a short period of time. All four cells may eventually attach to a substrate and then divide repeatedly to form new Oedogonium filament.

The life cycle of Oedogonium is haplontic. The egg from the oogonia and the sperm from the antheridia fuse and form a zygote which is diploid (2n). The zygote then undergoes meiosis and reproduces asexually to form the filamentous green alga which is haploid (1n).

Genetics
Oedogonium nuclear genomes are rather unexceptional, and genome size and organisation remain largely unstudied within its phylum.

Oedogonium contain chloroplast with very distinct genome architecture. This genome is 196,547bp in length, and is the most compact among photosynthetic chlorophytes. It has a nonconforming quadripartite structure, with 17 group I and 4 group II introns – making it incredibly intron-rich. It has four long open reading frames (ORFs), containing 99 different conserved genes. Two of these ORFs showed high similarities to genes not usually found in cpDNA (chloroplast DNAs).
The chloroplastic genome of Oedogonium reveals character evidence for a close alliance between the OCC clade. Although more data is required to validate these findings, there molecular signatures are strong supports for this dichotomy and for the branching of Oedogonium as the earliest-diverging lineage of the OCC clade.

Practical Importance
Recent studies from 2007 onwards have revealed that Oedogonium cells have a maximum high heavy metal absorption capacity (qe). The major mechanism of the lead–absorption interaction has been found to be ionic interactions and complex formation between metal cations and ligands contained within the structure of Oedogonium filaments. The biosorption of heavy metal ions by the Oedogoniales occur in two stages; an initial rapid uptake due to surface adsorption on the three major cell wall components, and then a subsequent slow uptake due to membrane transport of metal ions to the cytoplasm of the cells. The three cell surfaces of an Oedogonium filamentous cell consist of polysaccharides, proteins and lipids which provide several functional groups capable of binding to heavy metal ions. 

Oedogonium are readily available, non-toxic microorganisms which may be cultivated and/or cultured easily.  
Due to their position at the surface, algal blooms can block out the sunlight from other organisms and deplete oxygen levels in the water during peak summer months. Each alga included in the bloom is short-lived, and this results in a high concentration of dead organic matter. The decay process consumes dissolved oxygen in the water, resulting in hypoxic conditions. Without enough dissolved oxygen in the water, animals and plants may die off in large numbers. When blooms are in effect, removing these cells has a positive effect on their ecosystem and may be dried and used to effectively absorb harmful heavy metals from other freshwater systems such as industrial wastes.Oedogonium can also significantly clog irrigation canals when growth on concrete surfaces becomes excessive due to high levels of benthic filaments.  Removal of Oedogonium from clogged irrigation canals can also prove to be cost effective as they may once again be dried and used for absorption of heavy metals.

Species List

This is a list of all accepted Oedogonium species:

A

Oedogonium abbreviatum (Hirn) Tiffany, 1934
Oedogonium ackleyae Tiffany
Oedogonium acmandrium Elfving ex Hirn, 1900
Oedogonium acrospirum Skuja, 1949
Oedogonium acrosporum De Bary ex Hirn, 1900
Oedogonium aculeatum C.-C.Jao, 1979
Oedogonium acuminatum (Hirn) Tiffany
Oedogonium acutum (West & G.S.West) Tiffany
Oedogonium aequale (Hassall) Kützing
Oedogonium affine Kützing
Oedogonium affine (Hassall) Kützing
Oedogonium agrarium H.-Z.Zhu, 1979
Oedogonium ahlstrandii Wittrock ex Hirn, 1900
Oedogonium ahmadii Farooq & Faridi
Oedogonium ahmedabadense Kamat
Oedogonium alatum (Hassall) Kützing, 1849
Oedogonium alatum C.-C.Jao, 1979
Oedogonium albertii Gauthier-Lièvre
Oedogonium allorgeanum Lacerda
Oedogonium alpinum Kützing
Oedogonium alsium Skuja
Oedogonium alternans Wittrock & P.Lundell ex Hirn, 1900
Oedogonium amagerense Hallas
Oedogonium ambiceps (Jao) Tiffany
Oedogonium americanum Transeau, 1917
Oedogonium amplius (W.R.Taylor) Tiffany
Oedogonium amplum Magnus & Wille, 1884
Oedogonium amurense Skvortzov
Oedogonium anastomosans C.-C.Jao, 1979
Oedogonium andinum Tutin
Oedogonium angustissimum West & G.S.West ex Hirn, 1900
Oedogonium angustistomum Hoffman, 1967
Oedogonium annulare Gonzalves & Jain, 1970
Oedogonium anomalum Hirn, 1900
Oedogonium antillarum P.L.Crouan & H.M.Crouan
Oedogonium apiculatum Wolle
Oedogonium aquaticum Kamat, 1963
Oedogonium archerianum Cooke
Oedogonium arcyosporum Nordstedt, 1900
Oedogonium areolatocostatum C.-C.Jao, 1979
Oedogonium areolatofaveolatum C.-C.Jao, 1979
Oedogonium areolatum Lagerheim ex Hirn, 1900
Oedogonium areolatum (Singh) Mrozinska, 1985
Oedogonium areoliferum (C.-C.Jao) Tiffany, 1937
Oedogonium areschougii Wittrock ex Hirn, 1900
Oedogonium argenteum Hirn, 1900
Oedogonium armigerum Hirn, 1900
Oedogonium armoricanum Villeret
Oedogonium arnoldii Kiselev
Oedogonium arnoldii Roll
Oedogonium ashihoense Skvortzov
Oedogonium ashihoense Skvortzov & Noda
Oedogonium aster Wittrock ex Hirn, 1900
Oedogonium aureum (Tilden) Tiffany
Oedogonium australianum Hirn, 1900
Oedogonium autumnale Wittrock ex Hirn, 1900
Oedogonium aveirense Lacerda

B

Oedogonium baginiense Mrozinska-Webb, 1976
Oedogonium bahusiense Nordstedt ex Hirn, 1900
Oedogonium bancroftii Stephen Skinner & Timothy John Entwisle|Entwisle, 2006
Oedogonium bathmidosporum Nordstedt
Oedogonium bayanhaoteense C.-C.Jao, 1979
Oedogonium bengalense Hirn, 1900
Oedogonium berolinense Wittrock
Oedogonium bharatense Gonzalves & Sonnad
Oedogonium bharuchae Kamat
Oedogonium biforme Nordstedt ex Hirn, 1900
Oedogonium bohemicum Hirn, 1900
Oedogonium bombycinum (Bory) Montagne
Oedogonium boreale Hirn, 1900
Oedogonium borgei (Hirn) Tiffany, 1934
Oedogonium borisianum Wittrock ex Hirn, 1900
Oedogonium borisii (Lecl.) Kützing
Oedogonium boscii Wittrock ex Hirn, 1900
Oedogonium bourrellyanum Villeret, 1951
Oedogonium boyanum Claassen
Oedogonium brasilense Borge ex Hirn, 1900
Oedogonium braunii Kützing ex Hirn, 1900
Oedogonium breve C.-C.Jao, 1979
Oedogonium brevicingulatum C.-C.Jao, 1935
Oedogonium brevifilum C.-C.Jao, 1979
Oedogonium brittonii Tiffany, 1936
Oedogonium broterianum Lacerda, 1945
Oedogonium brunelii Gonzalves & Jain

C

Oedogonium caespitosum P.L.Crouan & H.M.Crouan
Oedogonium calcareum Cleve & Wittrock, 1900
Oedogonium calcareum Ripart, 1876
Oedogonium calliosporum C.-C.Jao, 1979
Oedogonium calosporum Hirn
Oedogonium calosporum C.C.Jao, 1936
Oedogonium calvum Wittrock ex Hirn, 1900
Oedogonium calyptratum C.-C.Jao, 1979
Oedogonium canadense (Tiffany) Tiffany
Oedogonium candollei Kützing
Oedogonium cantonense S.-H.Ley, 1949
Oedogonium capense Nordstedt & Hirn, 1900
Oedogonium capillaceum Kützing
Oedogonium capillare Kützing ex Hirn, 1900
Oedogonium capilliforme Kützing ex Hirn, 1900
Oedogonium capitellatum Wittrock ex Hirn, 1900
Oedogonium capricornicum Stephen Skinner & Timothy John Entwisle|Entwisle, 2006
Oedogonium carbonicum Wittrock
Oedogonium cardiacum Wittrock ex Hirn, 1900
Oedogonium caricosum C.-C.Jao, 1979
Oedogonium carinatum C.-C.Jao, 1979
Oedogonium carolinianum Tiffany
Oedogonium catenatum H.-Z.Zhu, 1964
Oedogonium catenulatum Kützing
Oedogonium catenulum Kützing
Oedogonium cearense Tiffany, 1937
Oedogonium cerasinum Stephen Skinner & Entwisle, 2006
Oedogonium chapmanii Tiffany
Oedogonium charkoviense Arnoldi & Y.V.Roll, 1939
Oedogonium chengkiangense C.-C.Jao, 1979
Oedogonium chowdarii J.P.Keshri, 2012
Oedogonium chungkingense (C.-C.Jao) C.-C.Jao, 1936
Oedogonium ciliare de Notaris
Oedogonium ciliatum Pringsheim ex Hirn, 1900
Oedogonium circinatum Tiffany
Oedogonium circumlineatum M.E.Britton
Oedogonium circumplicatum Margalef
Oedogonium citriforme Hallas
Oedogonium clavatum Hallas, 1905
Oedogonium cleveanum Wittrock ex Hirn, 1900
Oedogonium cloverae Lillick
Oedogonium collinsii Tiffany
Oedogonium columbianum (G.West) Tiffany
Oedogonium commune (Hirn) Tiffany
Oedogonium completum (Hirn) Tiffany
Oedogonium compressum (Hassall) Kützing
Oedogonium concatenatum Wittrock ex Hirn, 1900
Oedogonium confertum Hirn, 1900
Oedogonium conflectum C.-C.Jao, 1979
Oedogonium congolense Gauthier-Lièvre, 1964
Oedogonium consociatum Collins & Hervey, 1917
Oedogonium constrictum C.-C.Jao, 1976
Oedogonium contortum Hallas, 1905
Oedogonium corrugatum C.-C.Jao, 1979
Oedogonium costatosporum C.-C.Jao, 1934
Oedogonium costatum Transeau, 1930
Oedogonium costulatum C.-C.Jao, 1979
Oedogonium crassidens C.-C.Jao, 1936
Oedogonium crassiusculum Wittrock ex Hirn, 1900
Oedogonium crassum Wittrock ex Hirn, 1900
Oedogonium crenulatocostatum Wittrock ex Hirn, 1900
Oedogonium crenulatum Wittrock ex Hirn, 1900
Oedogonium cribbianum Stephen Skinner & Entwisle, 2006
Oedogonium crispulum Wittrock & Nordstedt
Oedogonium crispum Wittrock ex Hirn, 1900
Oedogonium croasdalea C.C.Jao
Oedogonium croasdaleae C.C.Jao
Oedogonium croceum C.-C.Jao, 1979
Oedogonium cryptoporum Wittrock ex Hirn, 1900
Oedogonium curtum Wittrock & P.Lundell ex Hirn, 1900
Oedogonium curvum Pringsheim ex Hirn, 1900
Oedogonium cuspidatum Kützing
Oedogonium cuvieri (Le Clerc) Kützing
Oedogonium cyathigerum Wittrock ex Hirn, 1900
Oedogonium cyclostomum Gauthier-Lièvre, 1964
Oedogonium cylindricum C.-C.Jao, 1942
Oedogonium cylindrosporum C.-C.Jao, 1979
Oedogonium cymatosporum Wittrock & Norstedt, 1900

D

Oedogonium dacchense Islam & Sarma, 1963
Oedogonium danicum Hallas, 1905
Oedogonium dawsonii Prescott, 1957
Oedogonium debaryanum Chmielevsky
Oedogonium decaryi Gauthier-Lièvre
Oedogonium decipiens Wittrock ex Hirn, 1900
Oedogonium delacerdanum Villeret, 1951
Oedogonium delicatulum Kützing
Oedogonium demaretianum Compère, 1976
Oedogonium densioculum C.-C.Jao, 1979
Oedogonium densum C.-C.Jao, 1979
Oedogonium dentireticulatum C.-C.Jao, 1936
Oedogonium dentireticulosporum Gonzalves & Jain
Oedogonium depressum Pringsheim ex Hirn, 1900
Oedogonium desikacharyi Khan & Kukreti
Oedogonium desikacharyi Gonzalves & Jain
Oedogonium detonii González Guerrero
Oedogonium de-tonii P.González, 1964
Oedogonium dictyosporum Wittrock ex Hirn, 1900
Oedogonium didymosporum Montagne
Oedogonium didymum Novis
Oedogonium dimorphum C.-C.Jao, 1979
Oedogonium dioicum H.J.Carter ex Hirn, 1900
Oedogonium dioicum Pétrovsky
Oedogonium diplandrum Jurányi
Oedogonium discretum Tiffany, 1951
Oedogonium dissimile C.-C.Jao, 1979
Oedogonium diversum (Hirn) Tiffany
Oedogonium doliiforme C.-C.Jao, 1979
Oedogonium donnellii Wolle ex Hirn, 1900
Oedogonium drouetii Tiffany
Oedogonium dubium Kützing
Oedogonium dubium (Hassall) Kützing
Oedogonium dungchwanense C.-C.Jao, 1979

E

Oedogonium echinatum Wittrock ex Hirn, 1900
Oedogonium echinatum H.C.Wood
Oedogonium echinospermum A.Braun ex Hirn, 1900
Oedogonium echinospirale Lacerda, 1946
Oedogonium echinosporum A.Braun
Oedogonium elegans Kützing, 1849
Oedogonium elegans West & G.S.West, 1902
Oedogonium elegans Skvortzov, 1946
Oedogonium ellipsoideum R.N.Singh
Oedogonium ellipsosporum R.N.Singh, 1938
Oedogonium eminens (Hirn) Tiffany, 1934
Oedogonium epiphyticum Transeau & Tiffany, 1934
Oedogonium epiphyticum Skvortzov
Oedogonium epiphyticum Skvortzov & Noda
Oedogonium erceense Villeret
Oedogonium eremitum Hallas
Oedogonium eriense Tiffany, 1936
Oedogonium erythrospermum Montagne
Oedogonium estarrejae Lacerda
Oedogonium euganeorum Wittrock
Oedogonium excavatum C.-C.Jao, 1934
Oedogonium excentriporum (C.-C.Jao) Tiffany, 1937
Oedogonium excisum Wittrock & P.Lundell ex Hirn, 1900
Oedogonium excitans H.Szymanska
Oedogonium exiguum Elfving
Oedogonium exile Ley
Oedogonium exmonile Tiffany
Oedogonium exocostatum Tiffany, 1921
Oedogonium exospirale Tiffany, 1924
Oedogonium exostriatum Tiffany
Oedogonium exoticum (Hirn) Tiffany

F

Oedogonium fabulosum Hirn, 1900
Oedogonium fallax Skvortzov
Oedogonium fallax Skvortzov & Noda
Oedogonium fanii C.-C.Jao, 1938
Oedogonium fasciatum (Hassall) Kützing, 1849
Oedogonium fasciculare P.L.Crouan & H.M.Crouan
Oedogonium fasciculum H.-Z.Zhu, 1964
Oedogonium fecundum C.-C.Jao, 1979
Oedogonium fennicum (Tiffany) Tiffany
Oedogonium figueirense Lacerda
Oedogonium figuratum Tiffany, 1936
Oedogonium fioniae Hallas
Oedogonium flavescens Wittrock ex Hirn, 1900
Oedogonium flexuosum Hirn, 1900
Oedogonium fluitans P.L.Crouan & H.M.Crouan
Oedogonium fonticola A.Braun ex Hirn, 1900
Oedogonium fontinale 
Oedogonium formosum Kamat
Oedogonium fossum Skvortzov & Noda
Oedogonium foveolatum Wittrock ex Hirn, 1900
Oedogonium fragile Wittrock ex Hirn, 1900
Oedogonium franconicum O.Bock & W.Bock, 1954
Oedogonium frankilianum 
Oedogonium franklinianum Wittrock ex Hirn, 1900
Oedogonium fremyi Gauthier-Lièvre, 1963
Oedogonium fructiferum Skvortzov & Noda
Oedogonium fructum Leiblein
Oedogonium fugacissimum (Roth) Rabenhorst
Oedogonium fuscescens (Kützing) Kützing
Oedogonium fuscolutescens Sprée
Oedogonium fuscum C.E.Taft
Oedogonium fusus Hallas, 1905

G

Oedogonium gallaecicum Margalef
Oedogonium gallicum Hirn, 1900
Oedogonium gelatinosum Kamat
Oedogonium gemelliparum Pringsheim
Oedogonium geminatum Kamat
Oedogonium geniculatum Hirn ex Hirn, 1900
Oedogonium giganteum Kützing ex Hirn, 1900
Oedogonium glabrum Hallas, 1905
Oedogonium glabrum Randhawa, 1936
Oedogonium globosum Nordstedt ex Hirn, 1900
Oedogonium goniatum C.-C.Jao, 1979
Oedogonium gonzalvesiae Islam & P.Sarma
Oedogonium gonzalvesiae Khan & Kukreti
Oedogonium gorakhporense R.H.Singh
Oedogonium gracile Kützing
Oedogonium gracilius Tiffany, 1934
Oedogonium gracillimum Wittrock & P.Lundell ex Hirn, 1900
Oedogonium grande Kützing ex Hirn, 1900
Oedogonium granulosporum Lacerda
Oedogonium gujaratense Kamat, 1962
Oedogonium gunnii Wittrock ex Hirn, 1900

H

Oedogonium haimenense C.-C.Jao, 1938
Oedogonium hallasiae Tiffany
Oedogonium hanchwanense C.-C.Jao, 1979
Oedogonium hardyi Stephen Skinner & Entwisle, 2006
Oedogonium harjedalicum Cedergren
Oedogonium hatei Kamat, 1963
Oedogonium heilungkiangense C.-C.Jao, 1979
Oedogonium heimii Gauthier-Lièvre, 1964
Oedogonium henriquesii Lacerda
Oedogonium heterogonium Kützing
Oedogonium hians Nordstedt & Hirn, 1900
Oedogonium hindustanense Kamat, 1963
Oedogonium hirnii Gutwinski ex Hirn, 1900
Oedogonium hispidum Nordstedt ex Hirn, 1900
Oedogonium hoehnei Borge, 1925
Oedogonium hoersholmiense Hallas, 1905
Oedogonium holsaticum Kützing
Oedogonium howei Tiffany, 1936
Oedogonium hsinganicum Skvortzov & Noda
Oedogonium hsingianicum Skvortzov
Oedogonium huillense West & G.S.West
Oedogonium humbertii Gauthier-Lièvre, 1964
Oedogonium humile C.-C.Jao, 1979
Oedogonium hunanense C.-C.Jao, 1938
Oedogonium huntii H.C.Wood ex Hirn, 1900
Oedogonium hystricinum Transeau & Tiffany, 1919
Oedogonium hystrix Wittrock ex Hirn, 1900

I

Oedogonium ibadanense Gauthier-Lièvre
Oedogonium idioandrosporum (Nordstedt & Wittrock ex Hirn) Tiffany, 1934
Oedogonium illinoisense Transeau, 1914
Oedogonium ilsteri Skuja, 1934
Oedogonium imahorii Kamat
Oedogonium implexum Hirn, 1900
Oedogonium inaequale (Hassall) Kützing
Oedogonium inaequale H.C.Wood, 1869
Oedogonium incertum Tiffany
Oedogonium inclusum Hirn
Oedogonium inconspicuum Hirn, 1900
Oedogonium incrassatum Hallas ex Andersen, 1945
Oedogonium indianense Britton & B.M.Smith, 1935
Oedogonium indicum Hirn, 1900
Oedogonium inerme Hirn, 1900
Oedogonium infimum Tiffany
Oedogonium infirmum Tiffany, 1924
Oedogonium inflatum Hallas, 1905
Oedogonium inframediale C.-C.Jao, 1935
Oedogonium insigne Hirn, 1900
Oedogonium intermedium Wittrock ex Hirn, 1900
Oedogonium inversum Wittrock ex Hirn, 1900
Oedogonium iowense Tiffany, 1924
Oedogonium irregulare Wittrock ex Hirn, 1900
Oedogonium ituriense Gauthier-Lièvre, 1964
Oedogonium itzigsohnii De Bary ex Hirn, 1900
Oedogonium iyengarii Gonzalves & Jain

J

Oedogonium jaoi Tiffany
Oedogonium jaoi Mrozinska
Oedogonium jharkhandense P.Mahato & A.K.Mahato
Oedogonium jordanovii Vodenicharov

K

Oedogonium keralense N.A.Erady & K.Rajappan
Oedogonium khannae Skuja, 1949
Oedogonium kiangchwanense C.-C.Jao, 1979
Oedogonium kiayuanense C.-C.Jao, 1979
Oedogonium kirchneri Wittrock ex Hirn, 1900
Oedogonium kirtikarii Kamat, 1963
Oedogonium kitutae G.S.West, 1907
Oedogonium kjellmanii Wittrock ex Hirn, 1900
Oedogonium koechlinii Gauthier-Lièvre, 1964
Oedogonium kolhapurense Kamat, 1963
Oedogonium kozminskii Prescott
Oedogonium kufferathii Gauthier-Lièvre, 1964
Oedogonium kunmingense H.-Z.Zhu, 1964
Oedogonium kurzii Zeller ex Hirn, 1900
Oedogonium kushmiense R.N.Singh
Oedogonium kwangsiense C.-C.Jao, 1947
Oedogonium kwangtungense S.-H.Ley, 1949

L

Oedogonium lacustre (Hassall) Rabenhorst
Oedogonium laetevirens P.L.Crouan & H.M.Crouan, 1878
Oedogonium laetevirens Wittrock ex Hirn, 1900
Oedogonium laetivirens P.L.Crouan & H.M.Crouan
Oedogonium laeve Wittrock ex Hirn, 1900
Oedogonium lageniforme Hirn, 1900
Oedogonium lagerheimii Wittrock
Oedogonium lagerstedetii Wittrock ex Hirn, 1900
Oedogonium lagerstedtii Wittrock ex Hirn, 1900
Oedogonium landsboroughii Wittrock ex Hirn, 1900
Oedogonium lanternoides C.-C.Jao, 1979
Oedogonium laporteanum M.E.Britton
Oedogonium laschii Rabenhorst
Oedogonium laticircellum C.-C.Jao, 1979
Oedogonium latiusculum Tiffany, 1924
Oedogonium latviense (Tiffany) Tiffany
Oedogonium lautumniarium 
Oedogonium lautumniarum Wittrock ex Hirn, 1900
Oedogonium leiopleurum Nordstedt & Hirn, 1900
Oedogonium leiriense Lacerda
Oedogonium lemmermannii Tiffany, 1934
Oedogonium lindmanianum Wittrock ex Hirn, 1900
Oedogonium lisbonense Lacerda, 1949
Oedogonium londinense Wittrock ex Hirn, 1900
Oedogonium longatum Kützing ex Hirn, 1900
Oedogonium longiarticulatum (Hansgirg) Tiffany
Oedogonium longicolle Nordstedt ex Hirn, 1900
Oedogonium longipilum C.-C.Jao, 1937
Oedogonium longisporum Gauthier-Lièvre, 1964
Oedogonium longum (Transeau) Tiffany
Oedogonium lopesianum Lacerda
Oedogonium lorentzii Wille
Oedogonium loricatum Hirn ex Hirn, 1900
Oedogonium louisianense Taft, 1946
Oedogonium lucens Zanardini
Oedogonium luisierianum Lacerda, 1958
Oedogonium lusitanicum Lacerda

M

Oedogonium macrandrium Wittrock ex Hirn, 1900
Oedogonium macrandrum Wittrock
Oedogonium macrospermum West & G.S.West ex Hirn, 1900
Oedogonium macrosporum P.L.Crouan & H.M.Crouan
Oedogonium magnusii Wittrock ex Hirn, 1900
Oedogonium maharastrense Kamat, 1963
Oedogonium majus (Hansgirg) Tiffany
Oedogonium mammiferum Wittrock ex Hirn, 1900
Oedogonium manschuricum Skvortzov, 1926
Oedogonium margaritiferum Nordstedt & Hirn, 1900
Oedogonium marinum Kützing
Oedogonium martinicense Hirn, 1900
Oedogonium mattiei Claassen
Oedogonium matvienkoi Y.V.Roll, 1948
Oedogonium maximum West & G.S.West, 1901
Oedogonium mediale Tiffany, 1937
Oedogonium megaporum 
Oedogonium megasporum Wittrock ex Hirn, 1900
Oedogonium meneghinianum Kützing
Oedogonium meridionale Arnoldi & Y.V.Roll, 1939
Oedogonium mesianum Claassen
Oedogonium mesoreticulatum J.P.Keshri, 2012
Oedogonium mesospirale R.N.Singh
Oedogonium mexicanum Wittrock ex Hirn, 1900
Oedogonium michiganense Tiffany, 1927
Oedogonium micraster C.-C.Jao, 1979
Oedogonium microdictyon C.-C.Jao, 1979
Oedogonium microgonium Prescott, 1944
Oedogonium midnapurense J.P.Keshri, 2012
Oedogonium minisporum Taft, 1939
Oedogonium minus Wittrock ex Hirn, 1900
Oedogonium minutum Kützing
Oedogonium mirabile H.C.Wood, 1869
Oedogonium mirandrium Skuja, 1927
Oedogonium mirificum H.-Z.Zhu, 1964
Oedogonium mirpurense Islam, 1965
Oedogonium mitratum Hirn, 1900
Oedogonium moebiusii Skinner & Entwisle, 2006
Oedogonium monile Berkeley & Harvey ex Hirn, 1900
Oedogonium moniliforme Wittrock ex Hirn, 1900
Oedogonium monodii Gauthier-Lièvre, 1964
Oedogonium montagnei Fiorini-Mazzanti ex Hirn, 1900
Oedogonium muelleri (Hassall) Kützing
Oedogonium multiplex Skvortzov
Oedogonium multiplex Skvortzov & Noda
Oedogonium multisporum H.C.Wood ex Hirn, 1900
Oedogonium muratii Gauthier-Lièvre, 1964
Oedogonium murense Lazar
Oedogonium mutabile C.-C.Jao, 1979

N

Oedogonium nagii Chaudhuri
Oedogonium nankingense C.-C.Jao, 1937
Oedogonium nanum Wittrock ex Hirn, 1900
Oedogonium nebraskense Ohashi, 1926
Oedogonium neomitratum C.C.Jao
Oedogonium nigeriense Gauthier-Lièvre, 1964
Oedogonium nigrum Lacerda, 1946
Oedogonium nitellae H.-Z.Zhu, 1964
Oedogonium nitidum C.-C.Jao, 1947
Oedogonium nobile Wittrock ex Hirn, 1900
Oedogonium nodosum Kützing
Oedogonium nodulosum Wittrock ex Hirn, 1900
Oedogonium nordstedtii Wittrock

O

Oedogonium obesum Hirn, 1900
Oedogonium oblongellum Kirchner, 1900
Oedogonium oblongum Wittrock ex Hirn, 1900
Oedogonium obovatum C.-C.Jao, 1979
Oedogonium oboviforme Wittrock ex Hirn, 1900
Oedogonium obpyriforme C.-C.Jao, 1979
Oedogonium obsidionale Cornu
Oedogonium obsoletum Wittrock ex Hirn, 1900
Oedogonium obtruncatum Wittrock ex Hirn, 1900
Oedogonium occidentale (Hirn) Tiffany, 1934
Oedogonium ocellatum C.-C.Jao, 1979
Oedogonium ochroleucum (Berk.) Kützing
Oedogonium octagonum C.-C.Jao, 1979
Oedogonium oelandicum Wittrock ex Hirn, 1900
Oedogonium operculatum Tiffany, 1936
Oedogonium opisthostomum Skuja, 1949
Oedogonium orientale C.-C.Jao, 1934
Oedogonium orientale (Skvortzov) Skvortzov
Oedogonium ornatum Hirn, 1896
Oedogonium ornatum Arnoldi & Y.V.Roll, 1939
Oedogonium oryzae Wittrock ex Hirn, 1900
Oedogonium ouchitanum C.E.Taft, 1935
Oedogonium ovatum (Hassall) Kützing
Oedogonium oviforme Hirn, 1900
Oedogonium ovoidosporum Arnoldi & Y.V.Roll, 1939
Oedogonium oyei Kamat, 1963

P

Oedogonium pachyandrium Wittrock ex Hirn, 1900
Oedogonium pachydermum Wittrock & P.Lundell ex Hirn, 1900
Oedogonium pakistanense Islam & P.Sarma, 1963
Oedogonium palaiense Chacko
Oedogonium pallidum Kützing
Oedogonium paloense M.E.Britton, 1948
Oedogonium paludosum Wittrock ex Hirn, 1900
Oedogonium pandeyi J.P.Keshri, 2012
Oedogonium paradoxum C.-C.Jao, 1979
Oedogonium paraguayense Tiffany
Oedogonium parasiticum (cag) Rabenhorst
Oedogonium parreticulatum C.C.Jao
Oedogonium parthasarathii P.Sarma, D.Mukherjee & A.K.Chakrabarty
Oedogonium parvulum Kützing
Oedogonium parvulum Wodenitscharov
Oedogonium parvum C.-C.Jao, 1936
Oedogonium patulum Tiffany, 1934
Oedogonium paucicostdtum 
Oedogonium paucocostatum Transeau, 1914
Oedogonium paucostriatum Tiffany
Oedogonium paulense Nordstedt & Hirn, 1900
Oedogonium peipingense C.-C.Jao, 1935
Oedogonium perpusillum Skvortzov
Oedogonium perreticulatum C.-C.Jao, 1979
Oedogonium perspicuum Hirn, 1900
Oedogonium petri Wittrock ex Hirn, 1900
Oedogonium philippinense M.E.Britton, 1948
Oedogonium pilbaranum Stephen Skinner & Entwisle, 2006
Oedogonium piliferum Auerswald
Oedogonium piliferum Wittrock
Oedogonium pilosporum West ex Hirn, 1900
Oedogonium pisanum Wittrock ex Hirn, 1900
Oedogonium pitotianum Gauthier-Lièvre
Oedogonium placentulum Skvortzov
Oedogonium placentulum Skvortzov & Noda
Oedogonium plagiostomum Wittrock ex Hirn, 1900
Oedogonium plicatulum Wittrock ex Hirn, 1900
Oedogonium pliciferum C.-C.Jao, 1979
Oedogonium plurisporum Arnoldi & Roll
Oedogonium plurisporum Wittrock ex Hirn, 1900
Oedogonium plusiosporum Wittrock ex Hirn, 1900
Oedogonium pluviale Nordstedt ex Hirn, 1900
Oedogonium poecilosporum Nordstedt & Hirn, 1900
Oedogonium polistandrium H.-Z.Zhu, 1979
Oedogonium polyandrium Prescott
Oedogonium polymorphum Wittrock & Lundell
Oedogonium polyspermum C.-C.Jao, 1979
Oedogonium porrectum Nordstedt & Hirn, 1900
Oedogonium praelongum Hallas, 1945
Oedogonium pratense Transeau, 1914
Oedogonium praticola Transeau, 1900
Oedogonium pratinaequalense M.E.Britton
Oedogonium prescottii Kamat
Oedogonium princeps Wittrock ex Hirn, 1900
Oedogonium pringsheimianum Archer
Oedogonium pringsheimii C.E.Cramer ex Hirn, 1900
Oedogonium propinquum Wittrock
Oedogonium psaegmatosporum Nordstedt ex Hirn, 1900
Oedogonium pseudacrosporum Wittrock, 1900
Oedogonium pseudareolatum C.-C.Jao, 1979
Oedogonium pseudaureum C.C.Jao
Oedogonium pseudoareachougii Gauthier-Lièvre
Oedogonium pseudoboscii Hirn, 1900
Oedogonium pseudocleveanum Gauthier-Lièvre, 1964
Oedogonium pseudodentireticulatum Gauthier-Lièvre
Oedogonium pseudofragile Claassen
Oedogonium pseudogunnii C.-C.Jao, 1979
Oedogonium pseudohirnii C.-C.Jao, 1979
Oedogonium pseudohowardii C.-C.Jao, 1979
Oedogonium pseudomitratum A.M.Scott & Prescott, 1958
Oedogonium pseudomitratum C.-C.Jao, 1979
Oedogonium pseudopachydermum J.P.Keshri, 2012
Oedogonium pseudoplenum Tiffany
Oedogonium pseudorothii C.-C.Jao, 1979
Oedogonium pseudorugulosun C.-C.Jao, 1938
Oedogonium pseudospirale Nygaard, 1932
Oedogonium pseudostarmachii J.P.Keshri, 2012
Oedogonium pseudosuecicum H.-Z.Zhu, 1979
Oedogonium pseudotumidulum Gauthier-Lièvre, 1964
Oedogonium pudicum Tiffany, 1951
Oedogonium puellae Skvortzov
Oedogonium pulchellum (Hassall) Kützing
Oedogonium pulchrum Nordstedt & Hirn, 1900
Oedogonium pullum Skvortzov & Noda
Oedogonium punctatostriatum De Bary ex Hirn, 1900
Oedogonium punctatum Wittrock ex Hirn, 1900
Oedogonium pungens Hirn, 1900
Oedogonium pusillum Kirchner ex Hirn, 1900
Oedogonium pygmaeum Gonzalves & Jain
Oedogonium pyrisporum Kiselev
Oedogonium pyrulum Wittrock ex Hirn, 1900

Q

Oedogonium quadratum Hallas, 1905
Oedogonium quezelii Gauthier-Lièvre, 1964
Oedogonium quintanilhae Lacerda, 1946

R

Oedogonium raikwarii Khan & Kukreti
Oedogonium ralfsii (Hassall) Kützing
Oedogonium randhawae Venkataraman
Oedogonium rarissimum Skvortzov
Oedogonium rarissimum Skvortzov & Noda
Oedogonium reductum Taft, 1946
Oedogonium regium E.O.Hughes
Oedogonium regium Hughes
Oedogonium reinschii J.Roy ex Hirn, 1900
Oedogonium repandum C.-C.Jao, 1979
Oedogonium repens Kamat
Oedogonium reticulatonervatum C.C.Jao
Oedogonium reticulatum West & G.S.West, 1902
Oedogonium reticulocostatum C.-C.Jao
Oedogonium reticulonervatum C.-C.Jao, 1979
Oedogonium reticulosporum Mrozinska, 1960
Oedogonium rhodosporum Wittrock ex Hirn, 1900
Oedogonium richterianum Nayal
Oedogonium richterianum Lemmermann ex Hirn, 1900
Oedogonium rigidum Hirn, 1900
Oedogonium ringens Hoffman
Oedogonium ripartii De Toni
Oedogonium rivulare A.Braun ex Hirn, 1900
Oedogonium rosenvingii Hallas
Oedogonium rostellatum Pringsheim
Oedogonium rothii Pringsheim ex Hirn, 1900
Oedogonium rufescens Wittrock ex Hirn, 1900
Oedogonium rugulosum Nordstedt ex Hirn, 1900
Oedogonium rupestre Hirn, 1900

S

Oedogonium salinum C.-C.Jao, 1979
Oedogonium sanctithomae Wittrock & Cleve ex Hirn, 1900
Oedogonium santapaui Kamat
Oedogonium santurcense Tiffany, 1936
Oedogonium sawyeri Prescott
Oedogonium saxatile Hansgirg, 1901
Oedogonium schmidlei Gutwinski ex Hirn, 1900
Oedogonium schweickerdtii Cholnoky, 1952
Oedogonium scrobiculatum Wittrock ex Hirn, 1900
Oedogonium scutatum Kützing
Oedogonium selandiae Hallas, 1905
Oedogonium seligeriense Arnoldi & Y.V.Roll, 1939
Oedogonium semiapertum Nordstedt & Hirn, 1900
Oedogonium setigerum Wolle
Oedogonium setigerum Hoffman
Oedogonium sexangulare Cleve ex Hirn, 1900
Oedogonium shantungense C.-C.Jao, 1979
Oedogonium shanxiense Y.J.Ling & S.L.Xie, 1999
Oedogonium silvaticum Hallas, 1905
Oedogonium simplex Hirn, 1900
Oedogonium sinense L.C.Li, 1933
Oedogonium sinensis 
Oedogonium singhbhumense P.Mahato & A.K.Mahato
Oedogonium singhii Kamat
Oedogonium singulare Kamat, 1962
Oedogonium sinuatum Transeau
Oedogonium skujae J.P.Keshri, 2012
Oedogonium smithii Prescott, 1944
Oedogonium sociale Wittrock ex Hirn, 1900
Oedogonium sodiroanum Lagerheim ex Hirn, 1900
Oedogonium sol Hirn, 1900
Oedogonium soldatovii Skvortzov
Oedogonium sordidum (Roth) Kützing
Oedogonium southlandiae Novis
Oedogonium spachtii Scott & Prescott
Oedogonium spechtii A.M.Scott & Prescott
Oedogonium speciosum S.-H.Ley, 1949
Oedogonium spectabile Hirn, 1900
Oedogonium spetsbergense Wittrock
Oedogonium sphaerandrum Wittrock & Lundell ex Hirn, 1900
Oedogonium sphaericoinconspicuum H.Silva, 1953
Oedogonium sphaericum (Hassall) Kützing
Oedogonium sphaerocephalum Gauthier-Lièvre
Oedogonium sphaeroideum Prescott, 1944
Oedogonium spheroideum Prescott
Oedogonium spinospermum Reinsch
Oedogonium spinosporum Gonzalves & Jain
Oedogonium spinosum Gonzalves & Sonnad, 1961
Oedogonium spirale Hirn, 1900
Oedogonium spiralidens C.-C.Jao, 1934
Oedogonium spiripennatum C.-C.Jao, 1934
Oedogonium spirostriatum Tiffany
Oedogonium spurium Hirn, 1900
Oedogonium stagnale Kützing
Oedogonium starmachii Mrozinska, 1958
Oedogonium stellatum Wittrock ex Hirn, 1900
Oedogonium stephensiae Tiffany, 1936
Oedogonium stictospermum (Skuja) Tiffany, 1949
Oedogonium striatum Randhawa
Oedogonium subacrosporum Gauthier-Lièvre, 1964
Oedogonium subareolatum Tiffany, 1936
Oedogonium subcapitellatum Hirn
Oedogonium subcymatosporum C.-C.Jao, 1936
Oedogonium subdentireticulatum C.-C.Jao, 1979
Oedogonium subdepressum C.-C.Jao, 1937
Oedogonium subdissimile C.-C.Jao, 1979
Oedogonium subellipsoideum Tiffany, 1934
Oedogonium subglobosum (Wittrock) Tiffany
Oedogonium subglobosum C.E.Taft
Oedogonium subintermedium Claassen
Oedogonium sublongicolle C.-C.Jao, 1979
Oedogonium submoniliforme Mrozinska-Webb, 1976
Oedogonium suboctangulare West & G.S.West, 1902
Oedogonium suboelandicum J.P.Keshri, 2012
Oedogonium subopistostomum J.P.Keshri, 2012
Oedogonium suborbiculare C.-C.Jao, 1936
Oedogonium subplagiostomum S.-H.Ley, 1949
Oedogonium subplenum Tiffany
Oedogonium subquadratum C.-C.Jao, 1979
Oedogonium subrectum Hirn, 1900
Oedogonium subrothii C.-C.Jao, 1979
Oedogonium subsetacem Kützing
Oedogonium subsexangulare Tiffany, 1934
Oedogonium subspirale Mrozinska, 1958
Oedogonium subspirale Gauthier-Lièvre
Oedogonium subspiralidens C.-C.Jao, 1979
Oedogonium subsuperbum J.P.Keshri, 2012
Oedogonium subtile Skvortzov, 1946
Oedogonium subtile H.-Z.Zhu, 1964
Oedogonium subulatum J.P.Keshri, 2012
Oedogonium subvaucheri Claassen
Oedogonium sudanense Gauthier-Lièvre, 1964
Oedogonium suecicum Wittrock ex Hirn, 1900
Oedogonium superbum C.-C.Jao, 1979
Oedogonium supremum Tiffany, 1924
Oedogonium svirencoi Arnoldi & Y.V.Roll, 1939
Oedogonium szemaoense C.-C.Jao, 1979
Oedogonium szymanskae Mrozinska, 2000

T

Oedogonium taftii Lacerda
Oedogonium taftii Tiffany
Oedogonium taliense C.-C.Jao, 1979
Oedogonium tapeinosporum Wittrock ex Hirn, 1900
Oedogonium taphrosporum Nordstedt & Hirn, 1900
Oedogonium taylorii C.-C.Jao, 1934
Oedogonium tenellum Kützing, 1845
Oedogonium tenerum C.-C.Jao, 1979
Oedogonium tentoriale Nordstedt & Hirn, 1900
Oedogonium tenue Kützing
Oedogonium tenuissimum Hansgirg ex Hirn, 1900
Oedogonium terrestre Randhawa, 1939
Oedogonium texense Taft, 1946
Oedogonium thanaense Gonzalves & Jain, 1970
Oedogonium thermale P.L.Crouan & H.M.Crouan
Oedogonium tibeticum Y.-X.Wei & H.J.Hu, 1984
Oedogonium tiffanii Ackley, 1929
Oedogonium tinghushanense C.-C.Jao, 1979
Oedogonium transeaui Gonzalves & Jain
Oedogonium transversum Hallas ex Andersen, 1945
Oedogonium triandronites H.J.Carter
Oedogonium trichospermum J.Hermann
Oedogonium trichosporum J.Hermann
Oedogonium trioicum Woronichin, 1923
Oedogonium tsingtaoense H.-Z.Zhu, 1964
Oedogonium tumidulum Wittrock ex Hirn, 1900
Oedogonium tungarense Gonzalves & Jain
Oedogonium turfosum (Areschoug) Kützing
Oedogonium turkestanicum Kiselev
Oedogonium typhae C.-C.Jao, 1979
Oedogonium tyrolicum Wittrock ex Hirn, 1900

U

Oedogonium uleanum Hirn, 1900
Oedogonium undulatum A.Braun ex Hirn, 1900
Oedogonium univerrucosum Obukhova
Oedogonium upsaliense Wittrock ex Hirn, 1900
Oedogonium urbicum Wittrock ex Hirn, 1900
Oedogonium urceolatum Nordstedt & Hirn, 1900
Oedogonium utrarium Stephen Skinner & Entwisle, 2006

V

Oedogonium validum C.-C.Jao, 1979
Oedogonium vanoyeanum Gauthier-Lièvre, 1964
Oedogonium variabile Y.V.Roll, 1945
Oedogonium variabile Hilse, 1863
Oedogonium variabile Gonzalves & Sonnad, 1962
Oedogonium varians Wittrock & Lundell ex Hirn, 1900
Oedogonium vaucheri A.Braun ex Hirn, 1900
Oedogonium velatum Hallas, 1905
Oedogonium vernale (Hassall) Wittrock
Oedogonium verrucosum Hallas, 1905
Oedogonium vesicatum Wittrock ex Hirn, 1900
Oedogonium viaticum H.Szymanska & H.Werblan-Jakubiec
Oedogonium victoriense G.S.West, 1906
Oedogonium virceburgense Hirn ex Hirn, 1900

W

Oedogonium wabashense Tiffany, 1927
Oedogonium warmingianum Wittrock ex Hirn, 1900
Oedogonium welwitschii West & G.S.West ex Hirn, 1900
Oedogonium westii (Tiffany & Brown) Tiffany & Brown
Oedogonium whitfordii Gonzalves & Jain
Oedogonium wirceburgense Hirn
Oedogonium wittrockianum Hirn
Oedogonium wolleanum Wittrock ex Hirn, 1900
Oedogonium wyliei Tiffany, 1926

Y

Oedogonium yunnanense C.-C.Jao, 1979

Z

Oedogonium zehneri (Tiffany) Tiffany, 1934
Oedogonium zigzag Cleve ex Hirn, 1900
Oedogonium zmiewicum Arnoldi & Y.V.Roll, 1939
Oedogonium zonatum (Weber & Mohr) V.Leiblein

References 

Chlorophyceae genera
Oedogoniales